1706 Rittenhouse is a private residence in Rittenhouse Square, Philadelphia, Pennsylvania. It is known for being an expensive residential building, with many units costing over $3.9 million.

Residents
The majority of the residents have a net worth of at least $10 million. The condo is home to surgeons, pediatricians, real estate magnates, CEOs, and professional athletes.


Notable residents
Cliff Lee - professional baseball player for the Philadelphia Phillies

See also
List of tallest buildings in Philadelphia

References

External links
1706 Rittenhouse website
The Harman Group - Structural Engineers website

Residential buildings completed in 2010
Residential condominiums in the United States
Residential skyscrapers in Philadelphia
2010 establishments in Pennsylvania
Apartment buildings in Pennsylvania